The 2009  Arizona State Sun Devils football team  represented Arizona State University during the 2009 NCAA Division I FBS football season. The Sun Devils were coached by third-year coach Dennis Erickson and played their home games at Sun Devil Stadium in Tempe, Arizona. The Sun Devils finished the season 4–8 (2–7 Pac-10).

Schedule

Game summaries

Idaho State

at Sun Devil Stadium, Tempe, Arizona Broadcast: FSN Arizona.

Junior placekicker Thomas Weber ties school record for 5 made field goals in a game and Senior Linebacker Mike Nixon earned Pac-10 Conference Defensive Player of Week for his 3 interceptions one of which returned for a touchdown and blocked punt.

Louisiana-Monroe

at Sun Devil Stadium, Tempe, Arizona Broadcast: FSN Arizona.

Georgia

at Sanford Stadium, Athens, Georgia Broadcast: ESPNU

Oregon State

at Sun Devil Stadium, Tempe, Arizona Broadcast: Versus

Washington State

at Martin Stadium, Pullman, Washington

Washington
Broadcast: FSN

at Sun Devil Stadium, Tempe, Arizona

Though it appeared the game would be heading into overtime, ASU quarterback Danny Sullivan threw a 50-yard touchdown pass to receiver Chris McGaha in the last five seconds of the game to give ASU the win.

Stanford

at Stanford Stadium, Stanford, California Broadcast: FSN

California

at Sun Devil Stadium, Tempe, Arizona

Both teams were 2-2 in the conference. The Bears fumbled in their first possession, but scored in the second possession on a Kevin Riley pass to Jahvid Best for 11 yards for a touchdown. Another touchdown pass, from Riley to Marvin Jones, gave Cal a 14-0 lead in the first quarter. For the Sun Devils, Samson Szakacsy completed a pass to Jovon Williams (3 yards) and Danny Sullivan passed to Kyle Williams (80 yards) for touchdowns to tie the game in the second quarter. Then Giorgio Tavecchio kicked a 25-yard field goal for Cal before the half.

In the third quarter, Giorgio Tavecchio kicked a 51-yard field goal to increase Cal's lead to 6. But Arizona State answered in the fourth quarter with a Cameron Marshall rush touchdown for 6 yards. Giorgio Tavecchio missed a 39-yard field goal with 5:46 left in the game, but kicked a 24-yard field goal to win the game.

USC

at Sun Devil Stadium, Tempe, Arizona

Oregon

at Autzen Stadium, Eugene, Oregon

UCLA

at Rose Bowl Stadium, Pasadena, California

Arizona

at Sun Devil Stadium, Tempe, Arizona

References

Arizona State
Arizona State Sun Devils football seasons
Arizona State Sun Devils football